There are many statues of Jesus, including:

Monumental statues 
 Christ the Redeemer is perhaps the most famous statue of Jesus Christ, located in Rio de Janeiro, Brazil.

Many other monumental statues of Jesus, include:
 Cerro del Cubilete in Guanajuato, Mexico
 Cerro de los Ángeles on a hill located in Getafe, Spain
 Christ at El Picacho in the north area of Tegucigalpa, capital of Honduras
 Christ Blessing in Manado, North Sulawesi, Indonesia
 Christ of Havana in Havana, Cuba
 Christ of the Abyss in various underwater locations
 Christ of the Mercy in the city of San Juan del Sur, Nicaragua
 Christ of the Ozarks in Arkansas, United States
 Christ of the Sacred Heart above the town of El Morro, near the city of Rosarito, Baja California, Mexico
 Christ of Vũng Tàu in Vung Tau city, Vietnam
 Christ the King (Almada) overlooking the city of Lisbon, Portugal
 Christ the King in Świebodzin, western Poland 
 Christ the Redeemer of the Andes (Argentina/Chile)
 Cristo Blanco, atop Pukamuqu in the Cusco Region of Peru
 Cristo de la Concordia in Cochabamba, Bolivia
 Cristo de las Noas in Torreón, Mexico
 Cristo della Minerva by Michelangelo, in Rome
 Cristo del Otero on the outskirts of the city of Palencia in Spain
 Cristo del Pacífico in Lima, Peru
 Cristo Redentore Christ the Redeemer of Maratea, Italy
 Cristo Rei, Lubango in Lubango, Angola. 
 Cristo Rei, Madeira in the Portuguese archipelago of Madeira
 Cristo Rei of Dili in Dili, East Timor
 Cristo Rey (Colombian statue) in the village of Los Andes, west of the city of Cali, Valle del Cauca, Colombia
 Cristo Rey (Mexican statue) in Silao Municipality in Guanajuato, Mexico
 Divine Mercy Shrine (Misamis Oriental) in El Salvador, Misamis Oriental, Philippines
 Heart of Jesus (Foişorul "Inima lui Isus") near Lupeni, Harghita, Romania
 Jesus de Greatest in Abajah village in Imo State, Nigeria
 King of Kings (defunct) near Monroe, Ohio, in the United States 
 Lux Mundi near Monroe, a replacement of King of Kings
 Monumento al Divino Salvador del Mundo in San Salvador City, El Salvador
 Statue of Jesus in Mansinam Island, West Papua, Indonesia 
 Sacred Heart of Jesus (Roxas, Capiz) in Roxas, Capiz in the Philippines
 Sagrat Cor de Jesus in Ibiza, Spain
 Statue of Jesus in Saidnaya, Syria
 Statue of Jesus Christ on top of the Temple Expiatori del Sagrat Cor in Barcelona, Spain
 Statue of the Holy Son in Wolmyeongdong, South Korea
 Statue of Jesus Christ at Buntu Burake Hill, South Sulawesi, Indonesia

Others 
 Bambino Gesu of Arenzano
 Batlló Majesty
 Black Nazarene
 Buddy Christ
 Chocolate Jesus
 Christ and St. Thomas (Verrocchio)
 Christ of the Abyss
 Christ of the Lanterns
 Christ of the Ohio
 Christus (Indianapolis)
 Christus (statue)
 Corpus (Bernini)
 Cristo de La Laguna
 Cristo de Tacoronte
 Cristo della Minerva
 Cristo Negro (Portobelo)
 The Dead Christ
 Crucifix (Michelangelo)
 The Deposition (Michelangelo)
 Gero Cross
 Holy Face of Lucca
 Holy Infant of Good Health
 Homeless Jesus
 Infant Jesus of Mechelen
 Infant Jesus of Prague
 Kristu tal-Baħħara
 Lamentation over the Dead Christ by Donatello, c. 1455-1460
 Monumento al Divino Salvador del Mundo
 Nazareno de Achaguas
 Child Jesus images in Mexico
 Niñopa
 Palestrina Pietà
 The Parable
 Pietà (Gregorio Fernandez)
 Pietà (Michelangelo)
 Replicas of Michelangelo's Pietà
 The Resurrection (Fazzini)
 Rondanini Pietà
 Rood of Grace
 Sacred Heart of Jesus (Indianapolis)
 Sagrat Cor de Jesus
 Santo Bambino of Aracoeli
 Holy Infant of Atocha
 Santo Niño de Cebú
 Señor de las Tribulaciones
 Señor de los Temblores
 Señor de Los Cielos (Tlaltenago, Zacatecas, Mexico)
 The Servant Christ
 Veiled Christ
 Virgin and Child from the Sainte-Chapelle
 Well of Moses

See also 
 Depiction of Jesus
 Life of Christ in art
 Pietà
 Replicas of Michelangelo's Pietà

References

Jesus
Jesus in art